The Tata Sierra, was a three-door sport utility vehicle produced by the Indian carmaker Tata Motors  It was based on the Tata Telcoline.

In the export market, the Sierra was sold as Tata Sport, Tata Telcosport and Tata Grand Telcosport, Tata Gurkha.

History 
The Tata Sierra was launched in 1991 and is the first off-road Sport Utility vehicle produced by the Indian company; and was based on the Tata Telcoline (pick-up originally launched in 1988 from which it takes  the mechanical parts, the front facia, and the internal dashboard.) The differences are in the shortened wheelbase at 2.40 meters (compared to the single-cab Telcoline). The Sierra was also one of the first cars for private transport in India and, being built on the Tata ''X2 platform" with side members and crossbars, could be used on every road surface, especially the uneven ones being proposed both rear-wheel drive and four-wheel drive. Compared to the Telcoline, soundproofing has been improved, making the interior more comfortable.

The body of the Sierra is three-door, the total length of the body is 4.41 meters, rear-wheel drive or 4WD full-time part-time with grafting system electrically controlled up to 60  km/h, equipped with the gearbox on all ratios, self-locking rear differential and front hubs with manual locking/unlocking; the suspensions are the same as those of the Telcoline with an oscillating double trapezoidal front axle and a rear axle with a rigid bridge layout with five pulling arms and coil springs.

Engine

The engine was the same as the Telcoline: the naturally aspirated, 2.0-liter 483 DL(DL stands for Diesel) four-cylinder diesel engine developed by Tata Motors in India. It has two valves per cylinder and indirect injection with pre-chamber and develops 63 horsepower. The gearbox is a G76 5-speed manual. The later Turbo model was powered by a 483DLTC( DLTC stands for Diesel Turbocharged) inline-four engine. Later this engine was used on the Tata sumo, safari, and winger(Van).

The cockpit was available only for four seats. The Sierra was also the first car produced in India with electric windows( This is false information. The Standard 2000 was the first car in India with power windows), air conditioning, an adjustable steering wheel, tachometer.

First Generation (1991)

At the time of launch (1991) the car came with a naturally aspirated (colloquially NA) 483 DL engine mated with a 5-speed gearbox, with power delivery to the rear wheels. Visually identical to the telcoline pickup from the front, the rear portion was a completely new design with large fixed alpine windows and entry through a front collapsible passenger seat. The rear bumper had plastic shrouds on either end and beveled lamps for illuminating the license plate located at the central recess. The car had body mounted tricolor tail lamp (clear lens-orange-red), and the headlamps came with black bezels, with amber lens turn indicators. The grill had a cheese grater appearance with the circular insignia flanked with two chrome bars. The "Tata Sierra" badge (Tata written atop sierra) adorned the front quarter panel on either side with a single Tata logo placed on the rear door, the wheel arches were very thin and installed along the contour of the arches. The spare wheel was externally mounted on the rear door and it came with a fabric cover having a stylized version of Tata Sierra written over it.

Second Generation (1997) 

As the emission norms became further restricted and customers expected more power, TATA launched a turbocharged version in July–August 1997. The car had the 2.0-liter diesel engine as used earlier, to which a turbocharger (single stage) was added hence the name 483 DLTC; the new engine was rated Euro 2 and had a maximum output of 87 horsepower. There was a marked visual change on the outside with a new bonnet that was extended further downward above the grill, the grill too was revised with the appearance of a Venetian blind and at the center, it had just the circular insignia (no chrome bars as earlier). The headlamps were revised too, the bezels were gone and now it became larger and visually more continuous with the indicators. At the rear too there were major revisions, and the car got heated windshields, tail lamps now become two-tone units (red-clear lens), the rear bumper became a completely wrapped-around unit(metal)reaching the rear wheel arches, the now sported additional tail lamp bars, and the registration plate was illuminated by a single bar at the top. The wheel arches were revised too and now became more prominent and large. Logos were revised too, with just "sierra" written right next to the body-mounted amber indicator on either side. Internally, the power window motor was changed and the new motor was directly linked instead of being linked via actuating cable. The wheel caps were revised, and so were the optional alloys. The steering became a 4-spoke unit, unlike the previous 2-spoke one. The car was received well by the media and saw increased demand globally. The seats were provided by Harita Grammar Ltd. and later by Tata Johnson Ltd.

In other countries

In Europe (especially in Spain, France, Germany, and Italy), the Sierra was imported in 1994 under the name Tata Sport or Tata Telcosport) in a single version with the 2.0L diesel engine Euro 2 in the rear wheel drive variant, while the 4x4 will be added in April 1998 proposed with the 2.0L turbodiesel. With the introduction of the turbodiesel engine, the name was changed to Tata Grand Telcosport in more markets like Spain. In Italy the Sierra was sold as a Tata Sport in two versions: base and Orciari, the latter exclusive for Italy was made by the Italian designer Orciari and featured an enriched endowment, two-tone bodywork, roof bars, and specific interior finishes.

Tata Sierra EV Concept (2020)

At the 2020 Auto Expo, Tata Motors showcased an EV concept with the same name. The car features the characteristic panoramic view rear window pane(fixed) similar to the Tata sierra(generation 1 and 2), with an additional sliding door for access to the rear lounge-like seating arrangement. The car will be based on a flexible ALFA platform. As per the in-house designer (Pratap Bose), This isn't a formal program yet, but it isn't just a show car either. A more practical version with a changed seating arrangement might be a reality somewhere in 2022-2023.

References

External links

Official Tata Motors Website

Sierra
Compact sport utility vehicles
Cars introduced in 1991